John Dimond may refer to:

John Dimond (fencer) (1892–1968), American fencer who competed in the 1920 Summer Olympics
John H. Dimond (1918–1985), Justice of the Alaska Supreme Court

See also
John Diamond (disambiguation)